This is an incomplete list of the names used for some major European cities in different (mostly) European languages.  In some countries where there are two or more languages spoken, such as Belgium or Switzerland, dual forms may be used within the city itself, for example on signage. This is the case in Ireland also, despite a low level of actual usage of the Irish language.  In other cases where a regional language is officially recognised, that form of the name may be used in the region, but not nationally. Examples include the Welsh language in Wales in the United Kingdom, and other languages in parts of Italy and Spain.

There is a slow trend to return to the local name, which has been going on for a long time. In English Livorno is now used, the old English form of Leghorn having become antiquated at least a century ago. In some cases, such as the replacement of Danzig with Gdansk, the official name has been changed in relatively recent times.  The government of Ukraine has recently made great efforts to make the rest of the world say Kyiv rather than Kiev.

U

V

W

Y

Z

References